Coolanol is a trade name for a series of silicate ester industrial coolants.  It is manufactured by Exxon Mobil Corporation.

The product meets many MIL-SPEC requirements, but is also available on the commercial civilian market.

External links
 Official website

Coolants
Silicate esters
ExxonMobil brands
Product management